Dalton Municipal Airport  is a city-owned public-use airport located six miles (10 km) southeast of the central business district of Dalton, a city in Whitfield County, Georgia, United States.

Facilities and aircraft 

For the 12-month period ending May 24, 2007, the airport had 24,000 aircraft operations, an average of 65 per day: 99% general aviation and 1% military.

References

External links 
Dalton Municipal Airport at City of Dalton web site

Dalton Airport facebook page

Airports in Georgia (U.S. state)
Buildings and structures in Whitfield County, Georgia
Transportation in Whitfield County, Georgia
Dalton, Georgia